The Brazilian Army General Staff ( - EME) is the general management body responsible for the coordination of the Brazilian Army, the land force of the Brazilian Armed Forces.

Mission
The EME's mission is to study, plan, guide, coordinate, and control at the general management level, the activities of the Army, in accordance with the decisions and guidelines defined by the Army High Command.

History
The history of the organization begin in the United Kingdom of Portugal, Brazil and the Algarves, when the predecessor body called Court Arms Command was created in 1808 by the Count of Linhares and the Minister of War at the time. The organization was renamed as Court Headquarters in 1824 by the Emperor Pedro I of Brazil, after the declation of independence September 1822. The current EME was founded on 24 October 1896, by the law No. 403, sanctioned by then President Prudente de Morais.

Organization
The EME is subdivided in six subcommands:

1st subcommand - Army policies and strategic guidelines, concerning personnel, education and culture systems
2nd subcommand - Policies and strategic guidelines concerning the Army's information system
3rd subcommand - Accomplish with Army's strategic planning
4th subcommand - Formulate and propose policies and strategic guidelines for the Army's logistical activities
5th subcommand - Formulate and propose policies and strategic guidelines for the Army's activities in the international area and in environmental management
5th subcommand - Plan, guide and coordinate at the general management level, the Army's economic and finance activities

Other subdommands
Administration assistance - Plan the administrative rationalization of the Army
Army Project Office (EPEx) - Responsible for conducting the Army's strategic projects

See also

 Future of the Brazilian Army

External links
 Brazilian Army General Staff
 Brazilian Ministry of Defense

References

Ministry of Defence (Brazil)
Brazil
Brazilian Army